Bungaree is a rural locality in the local government area (LGA) of King Island in the North-west and west LGA region of Tasmania. The 2016 census recorded a population of 24 for the state suburb of Bungaree.

History 
Bungaree is a confirmed locality. It is believed to be an Aboriginal word for “my country”.

Geography
The waters of the Southern Ocean form the western boundary.

Road infrastructure 
Route B25 (North Road) runs through from south to north.

References

Towns in Tasmania
King Island (Tasmania)